Home is the second studio album by American rock band Sevendust, released on August 24, 1999 through TVT Records. The album appeared on the Billboard 200, remained there for fourteen weeks and peaked at 19 on September 11, 1999. Home was certified gold on May 18, 2000 through the Recording Industry Association of America. The album features thirteen tracks on the United States release and sixteen tracks on the Japan release, with two tracks featuring artists outside of Sevendust. Three singles were released from the album, two of which appeared on the mainstream and modern Billboard charts.

"Waffle" is used in the 2001 Down to Earth film, and "Denial" is used in the 2001 ATV Offroad Fury video game.

Track listing

Japan release

Personnel 
Credits taken from the CD liner notes.

Sevendust
Lajon Witherspoon – lead vocals
Clint Lowery – lead guitar, backing vocals
John Connolly – rhythm guitar
Vinnie Hornsby – bass
Morgan Rose – drums, backing vocals

Additional musicians
Skin – additional vocals – "Licking Cream"
Pony 1 – additional vocals – "Bender"
Troy McLawhorn – additional guitar – "Bender"
Technical
Jay Jay French – executive producer
Toby Wright – producer, engineer
Sevendust – producers
Justin Walden – digital editing
Jonathan Leary – assistant digital editing
Robert "Jesse" Henderson – assistant digital editing
Andy Wallace – mixing
Steve Sisko – mixdown engineer
Stephen Marcussen – mastering
Artwork
Michelle Munoz-Dorna – art design
Roger Gorman – art design
Robin Glowski – art direction
Jon Gipe – photography
Caroline Greyshock – photography
Jana Leon – photography
Neil Zlozower – photography

Charts

Album

Singles

Release history

References

1999 albums
Sevendust albums
TVT Records albums
Albums produced by Toby Wright
Albums recorded at Long View Farm